Brendan Gielow (born October 24, 1987) is an American professional golfer.

Personal life 
Gielow was born in Grand Rapids, Michigan, the son of Eric and Renea Gielow. He graduated from Mona Shores High School in 2006, after moving as a child from Grand Rapids. In his tenure at Mona Shores, he played four years on the varsity golf team; in which he was named Mr. Golf (award given to the top high school golfer in the state) twice. He was also named to the Michigan Super Team, the All-State golf team, all four years he played. That distinction being that he is first and only person to earn that honor all four years of high school and as a freshman. He excelled in the classroom as well, maintaining a 4.0 GPA throughout high school.

Collegiate career 
Gielow enjoyed a successful freshman debut with Wake Forest. He played in four of their five events, having a 73.33 stroke average, placing him fourth on the team. In his first tournament, the Carpet Capital Collegiate, he placed third overall with an eight-under-par 208.

Gielow won the Northeast Amateur in 2008 and the Porter Cup in 2009.

Amateur wins
2008 Northeast Amateur
2009 Porter Cup

U.S. national team appearances
Amateur
Walker Cup:  2009 (winners)

References

American male golfers
Wake Forest Demon Deacons men's golfers
Golfers from Michigan
Sportspeople from Muskegon, Michigan
1987 births
Living people